Adriana Margarita Olguín Büche (born Luz Adriana Margarita Olguín Buche; 18 November 1911 – 24 December 2015) was a Chilean lawyer and politician. She was the Minister of Justice during the rule of Gabriel González Videla, making Olguín the first female minister of Chile.

Early life and education
Adriana Olguín de Baltra was born in Valparaíso in 1911 to Arsenio Olguín and Adela Büche. After studying in her hometown at the Liceo No 2 de Niñas, she joined the Faculty of Law and Social Sciences at the University of Chile. Olguín completed her thesis in 1936, Legal Loopholes and Judicial Discretion. Two years later she became a lawyer with "unanimous distinction". While studying at the university, she met her future husband, Alberto Baltra, with whom she had one son, Luis Alberto.

Career
After university, Olguín had a number of positions, both as a professional attorney for Valparaiso Customs and as a professor of Constitutional and Administrative Law. She was also politically active, having established the National Association of Housewives. Like her husband, she sympathized with the Radical Party, but was never an active member in it.

She was appointed Minister of Justice in 1952, during the government of Gabriel González Videla. Though she served only a short period of time, she is credited as being the first woman ever to hold a cabinet post in Latin America. Shortly after Olguín's appointment as Minister of Justice, María Teresa del Canto was named Minister of Education (1952–53), though women did not play a significant role in Chilean government until the 1990s.

Between 1946 and 1953 she worked in the Women's Bureau. In 1955 she joined the board of the Bar Association and during the 60's she was legal adviser to the Comptroller General of the Republic. She later joined the State Council convened by the military regime between 1981 and 1989.

References 

1911 births
2015 deaths
People from Valparaíso
University of Chile alumni
Chilean centenarians
Women government ministers of Chile
Chilean Ministers of Justice
Chilean women lawyers
Women centenarians
20th-century Chilean lawyers
20th-century Chilean politicians
20th-century Chilean women politicians
Female justice ministers
20th-century women lawyers
Government ministers of Chile